The following is a list of programs broadcast on MundoMax, a defunct Spanish-language broadcast television network owned by the Colombian broadcaster RCN Televisión and aimed at adults between the ages of 18 and 34. The network soft-launched on August 1, 2012 and officially debuted on August 13, 2012.

Final programming

Telenovelas
A Mano Limpia (August 13 – December 2012)
Asi Es La Vida 
Amor De Contrabando
Lado A Lado
La Vida Sigue
Rastros De Mentiras
La Guerrera
Azucar
Chepe Fortuna (August 13, 2012 – January 2013)
Cumbia Ninja (January 26, 2014 – 2014)
Diomedes 
El Capo (August 1, 2012 – 2016)
El Hombre de tu Vida (August 1, 2012 – November 2012)
José do Egito"El Joe La Leyenda (August 13 – December 2012)El Laberinto De AliciaEscuadrón del Aire: Naturaleza (2016)Heroes Al Rescate: Puro Destino (2016)La GuerreraKdabra (August 1, 2012 - 2013)Las Detectivas y El Victor (August 13, 2012 – January 2013)Las Santisimas (August 13, 2012 – January 2013)Los Exitosos Perez (August 13 – December 2012)Lynch (August 1, 2012 – 2012)Mentes en Shock (August 13, 2012 – 2013)Los Milagros de Jesús (2015)Pobres Rico (August 13, 2012 – January 2013)El Rey David (April 29 – December 2013)Suleiman, El Gran SultanTiempo final (August 13, 2012 – 2016)Tres Caínes (March 6 – June 21, 2013)Yo Soy Betty, La Fea (August 13, 2012 – 2015)

Programming produced by Univision for MundoMax:

Game shows100 Latinos Dijeron (September 9, 2013 – November 30, 2016)Atrévete a Cantar (March 18, 2013)Minuto Para Ganar (August 13, 2012 – November 30, 2016)

Reality showsEl Factor X (July 29, 2013 – September 2016)Protagonistas de Nuestra Tele (2013)

News programmingNoticias MundoFox (August 13, 2012 – July 27, 2015)

Lifestyle programmingCocineros (August 4, 2012–2014)Estilo de Vida (August 18, 2012–2016)Luz en Casa (August 18, 2012–2013)Manual de Supervivencia (August 18, 2012–2016)El Sabor de los Oficios (August 18, 2012–2016)Sabores de Familia (August 18, 2012–2014)Tu Vida Más Simple (August 4, 2012–2016)

Sports programmingPremier League (August 25, 2012–2016)Copa Bridgestone Sudamericana (2012–2016)Copa Santander Libertadores (2012–2016)Golden Boy Promotions (August 18, 2012–2016)UEFA Champions League (2012–2015)La Ultima Palabra (August 13, 2012–2016)

Children's programming
MundoMax KidsAre We There Yet?: World Adventure (August 5, 2012 – May 25, 2014)Artzooka! (August 3, 2014–November 27, 2016)Finding Stuff Out (2015–November 27, 2016)Iggy Arbuckle (August 5, 2012 – July 27, 2014)The Zula Patrol (August 5, 2012 – July 27, 2014)It's a Big Big World (2015–November 27, 2016)Making Stuff (June 1, 2014 – 2015)Mama Mirabelle's Home Movies (August 5, 2012 – July 27, 2014)Toot & Puddle (August 5, 2012 – July 27, 2014)Wibbly Pig (August 3, 2014–November 27, 2016)

XtremaMaxTransformers: Prime (2015–November 27, 2016)Transformers: Rescue Bots'' (2015–November 27, 2016)

References

External links
 MundoFox official website

MundoFox